Greenfield Township is one of eleven townships in LaGrange County, Indiana. As of the 2010 census, its population was 1,276 and it contained 628 housing units.

Greenfield Township was established in 1832.

Geography

References

External links
 Indiana Township Association
 United Township Association of Indiana

Townships in LaGrange County, Indiana
Townships in Indiana